Ezra 2 is the second chapter of the Book of Ezra in the Old Testament of the Christian Bible, or the book of Ezra-Nehemiah in the Hebrew Bible, which treats the book of Ezra and book of Nehemiah as one book. Jewish tradition states that Ezra is the author of Ezra-Nehemiah as well as the Book of Chronicles, but modern scholars generally accept that a compiler from the 5th century BCE (the so-called "Chronicler") is the final author of these books. The section comprising chapter 1 to 6 describes the history before the arrival of Ezra in the land of Judah  in 468 BCE. This chapter contains a list, known as the "Golah List", of the people who returned from Babylon to Judah following Cyrus's edict "by genealogy, family and place of habitation".

Text

The original text is written in Hebrew language. This chapter is divided into 70 verses.

Textual witnesses
Some early manuscripts containing the text of this chapter in Hebrew are of the Masoretic Text, which includes Codex Leningradensis (1008).

There is also a translation into Koine Greek known as the Septuagint, made in the last few centuries BCE. Extant ancient manuscripts of the Septuagint version include Codex Vaticanus (B; B; 4th century), and Codex Alexandrinus (A; A; 5th century).

An ancient Greek book called 1 Esdras (Greek: Ἔσδρας Αʹ) containing some parts of 2 Chronicles, Ezra and Nehemiah is included in most editions of the Septuagint and is placed before the single book of Ezra–Nehemiah (which is titled in Greek: Ἔσδρας Βʹ). 1 Esdras 5:7-46 is an equivalent of Ezra 2 (List of former exiles who returned).

The Community (2:1–63)

The list here is not an account the people who were recently back from the journey, but those who have arrived and settled down after returning from Babylon, where they currently reside in Palestine among the other inhabitants of the land – non-Jews and also the Jews who never left the land, "whom the Babylonians has left behind as undesirable". The genealogies apparently "function as authenticators of who has a right to be classified as an Israelite", because "those who could not prove their genealogy were excluded" (verses 59–63).

Verse 1
Now these are the children of the province, who went up out of the captivity of those who had been carried away, whom Nebuchadnezzar the king of Babylon had carried away to Babylon, and who returned to Jerusalem and Judah, everyone to his city;
"The province": refers to the "Persian province of Judah". 

Verse 2
Those who came with Zerubbabel were Jeshua, Nehemiah, Seraiah, Reelaiah, Mordecai, Bilshan, Mispar, Bigvai, Rehum, and Baanah.
The number of the men of the people of Israel:
"Zerubbabel": is the leader of the group and of Davidic line, so he is associated with the messianic hope in the book of Zechariah, although none of it is mentioned in this book.
Some names are written differently in the book of Nehemiah:
{|class=wikitable
!Ezra 2:2      !! Nehemiah 7:7
|-
|Seraiah || Azariah
|-
|Reelaiah || Raamiah
|-
|Mispar || Mispereth
|-
|Rehum || Nehum
|}
"Men of the people of Israel": The list makes the point that only those of the Gola (="the exiles") 'properly constituted "Israel"'.

Verse 16
the sons of Ater of Hezekiah—ninety-eight;
"Of Hezekiah": in Hebrew can also mean "[born] to Hezekiah", that is "through Hezekiah", or "through the family/house of Hezekiah" (cf.  NET Bible), or "through the line of Hezekiah" (cf.  NET Bible).

Verse 61
Also, of the sons of the priests: the sons of Habaiah, the sons of Hakkoz, and the sons of Barzillai (who had taken a wife from the daughters of Barzillai the Gileadite, and was called by their name).
"Hakkoz": the name of the seventh of "24 Priestly Divisions" in 1 Chronicles 24 (cf. Nehemiah 3:4, 21). This name appears in a stone inscription that was found in 1970 on a partially buried column in a mosque, in the Yemeni village of Bayt al-Ḥaḍir, among the ten names of priestly wards and their respective towns and villages. This "Yemeni inscription" is the longest roster of names of this sort ever discovered, unto this day. The names are legible on the stone column discovered by Walter W. Müller.

The Totals (2:64–67)
The number of the people here shows the depletion of the population; in time of Moses "the whole number of the people of Israel...from 20 years old and upward,... was 603,550" not counting the Levites, whereas in the time of David, "in Israel there were 800,000 valiant men who drew the sword, and the men of Judah were 500,000", but now the returned exiles, including the priests and Levites, only "amount to 42,360". The listing of servants and animals reflects "the status of the exiles, their resources and capabilities".

Temple Gifts (2:68–69)
Those arrived back in Jerusalem and Judah gave freewill offerings "toward the rebuilding of the house of God".

Resettlement (2:70)
The conclusion of the list is similar to the beginning (verse 1): "by affirming the resettlement of the exiles", as every person has now settled "in their own towns".

See also
Jerusalem
Jeshua
Related Bible parts: Nehemiah 7, Haggai 2

Notes

References

Sources

External links
 Jewish translations:
 Ezra - Chapter 2 (Judaica Press) translation [with Rashi's commentary] at Chabad.org
 Christian translations:
 Online Bible at GospelHall.org (ESV, KJV, Darby, American Standard Version, Bible in Basic English)
 Book of Ezra Chapter 2. Bible Gateway

02